Reza Andouz (born 31 March 1965) is a retired Greco-Roman wrestler from Iran. He won a silver medal at the 1986 Asian Games. He also participated at the 1988 Summer Olympics.

References

External links
 

1965 births
Living people
Iranian male sport wrestlers
Wrestlers at the 1988 Summer Olympics
Olympic wrestlers of Iran
Asian Games silver medalists for Iran
Asian Games medalists in wrestling
Wrestlers at the 1986 Asian Games
Medalists at the 1986 Asian Games
20th-century Iranian people
21st-century Iranian people